Pietro Buscaglia (9 February 1911 – 12 July 1997) was an Italian professional footballer who played as a midfielder.

Club career
Buscaglia played for 9 seasons (153 games, 50 goals) in the Serie A for clubs S.S. Lazio, A.C. Torino and A.C. Milan.

He was among the top 10 goalscorers of Serie A on two occasions: 1935–36 and 1936–37 (second best scorer with 17 goals behind Silvio Piola with 21).

International career
Buscaglia played his only game for the Italy national football team on 25 April 1937 in a game against Hungary.

External links
 

1911 births
1997 deaths
Italian footballers
Italy international footballers
Serie A players
Serie B players
S.S. Lazio players
Torino F.C. players
A.C. Milan players
Savona F.B.C. players

Association football midfielders
Vigevano Calcio players